The Siddaramaiah cabinet was the Council of Ministers in Karnataka, a state in South India headed by Siddaramaiah that was formed after the 2013 Karnataka Legislative Assembly elections.

Chief Minister & Cabinet Ministers

Minister of State

Parliamentary Secretaries

Former Members

See also
 Politics of Karnataka

References

External links
Council of Ministers

Siddaramaiah administration
Cabinets established in 2013
2013 establishments in Karnataka
Karnataka ministries
Indian National Congress state ministries
2018 disestablishments in India
Cabinets disestablished in 2018
2013 in Indian politics